Bucculatrix tetradymiae is a moth in the family Bucculatricidae. It is found in North America, where it has been recorded from the Mojave desert in California. It was first described by Kendall H. Osborne and Daniel Z. Rubinoff in 1997.

References

Natural History Museum Lepidoptera generic names catalog

Bucculatricidae
Moths described in 1997
Moths of North America